Parmena striatopunctata is a species of beetle in the family Cerambycidae. It was described by Sama in 1994. It is known from Turkey.

References

Parmenini
Beetles described in 1994